Willie Stokes was a Chicago drug kingpin.

Willie Stokes may also refer to:

 Willie Stokes (caddie), golf caddie and 2006 Caddie Hall of Fame inductee
 Willie "the Wimp" Stokes Jr., Willie Stokes' murdered son immortalized in the Stevie Ray Vaughan song, "Willie the Wimp" 
 Willie T. Stokes, fictional character played by Billy Bob Thornton in the move Bad Santa

See also
William Stokes (disambiguation)